Tyler Robert Lydon (born April 9, 1996) is a former American professional basketball player. He played college basketball for the Syracuse Orange.

High School career
Lydon attended Stissing Mountain High School in Pine Plains, New York, then spent two years at New Hampton School in New Hampton, New Hampshire. In 2014, he represented the United States at the FIBA Americas Under-18 Championship in Colorado Springs. He led the team in rebounds despite not starting any games en route to a gold medal. Lydon committed to Syracuse University to play college basketball.

College career
As a freshman at Syracuse, Lydon averaged 10.1 points, 6.3 rebounds and 1.8 blocks per game. As a sophomore, he averaged 13.2 points, 8.6 rebounds and 1.4 blocks per game. After the season, he entered the 2017 NBA draft.

Professional career

Denver Nuggets (2017–2019)
In the 2017 NBA draft, Lydon was selected by the Utah Jazz with the 24th pick in the first round, and was subsequently traded to the Denver Nuggets shortly after being selected as a part of the deal for Donovan Mitchell. Lydon was assigned to the Rio Grande Valley Vipers of the NBA G League on October 23, 2017, before being recalled back to the Nuggets on November 8. On March 3, 2019, Lydon was assigned to the Capital City Go-Go. The Nuggets declined to pick up the third year option for Lydon's contract for the 2019–20 season, making him an unrestricted free agent.

On July 17, 2019, Lydon signed with the Sacramento Kings. On October 21, 2019, the Sacramento Kings announced that they had waived Lydon.

In July 2021, Lydon participated in The Basketball Tournament. He played for the Boeheim's Army and won the winner-take-all $1 million prize. He also indicated that he would retire as a basketball player after the tournament.

Career statistics

NBA

Regular season

|-
| style="text-align:left;"| 
| style="text-align:left;"| Denver
| 1 || 0 || 2.0 || – || – || – || .0 || .0 || .0 || .0 || .0
|-
| style="text-align:left;"| 
| style="text-align:left;"| Denver
| 25 || 0 || 3.8 || .500 || .400 || .333 || .7 || .2 || .1 || .0 || .9
|- class="sortbottom"
| style="text-align:center;" colspan="2"| Career
| 26 || 0 || 3.7 || .500 || .400 || .333 || .7 || .2 || .1 || .0 || .9

NBA G League

Regular season

|-
| style="text-align:left;"| 2017–18
| style="text-align:left;"| Rio Grande Valley
| 15 || 13 || 31.3 || .529 || .377 || .737 || 8.3 || 2.1 || 1.1 || .5 || 12.8
|- 
| style="text-align:left;"| 2018–19
| style="text-align:left;"| Capital City
| 8 || 7 || 33.5 || .460 || .354 || .600 || 9.1 || 2.5 || .8 || .5 || 13.3
|- class="sortbottom"
| style="text-align:center;" colspan="2"| Career
| 23 || 20 || 32.1 || .502 || .368 || .676 || 8.6 || 2.2 || 1.0 || .5 || 12.9

College

|-
| style="text-align:left;"| 2015–16
| style="text-align:left;"| Syracuse
| 37 || 0 || 30.3 || .479 || .405 || .774 || 6.3 || 1.1 || 1.1 || 1.8 || 10.1
|-
| style="text-align:left;"| 2016–17
| style="text-align:left;"| Syracuse
| 34 || 34 || 36.1 || .473 || .395 || .836 || 8.6 || 2.1 || 1.0 || 1.4 || 13.2
|- class="sortbottom"
| style="text-align:center;" colspan="2"| Career
| 71 || 34 || 33.1 || .476 || .400 || .809 || 7.4 || 1.6 || 1.1 || 1.6 || 11.6

References

External links

Syracuse Orange bio
USA Basketball bio 

1996 births
Living people
American men's basketball players
Basketball players from New York (state)
Capital City Go-Go players
Denver Nuggets players
Forwards (basketball)
New York (state) Republicans
People from Hudson, New York
Rio Grande Valley Vipers players
Syracuse Orange men's basketball players
Utah Jazz draft picks
New Hampton School alumni